Gerhard Karl Hans Tötemeyer (born 21 May 1935) is a professor emeritus and retired Namibian politician who served as minister of local government between 2000 and 2004.

He was born in Gibeon, and spent the first four years of his life in Keetmanshoop, where his father worked as a missionary. When World War II broke out in September 1939, his family was on vacation in Germany, where they remained until 1950. At that time Tötemeyer spoke neither English nor Afrikaans, the official languages of South West Africa. He did not continue school owing to his language difficulties; the principal would have "placed him in so low a grade that [he] would have been frustrated".

He took up vocational training as a merchant at his uncle's general dealership and caught up with school after hours. When he finished his training in 1953, he entered Paul Roos Gymnasium in Stellenbosch, and matriculated in 1955. He then studied History at the University of Stellenbosch on a stipend awarded by the Administration of South West Africa. He graduated with a B Hons in 1959 and acquired the Secondary School teacher's diploma in 1960.

Tötemeyer returned to South West Africa and taught at Windhoek High School in 1961 and 1962. Afterwards he took up a research post at Freiburg, Germany, and obtained a D Phil from the University of Stellenbosch in 1974. Before entering politics he held several academic and administrative positions at the universities of Stellenbosch, the Transkei, and Cape Town. In 1987, shortly before Namibian Independence, he moved to Windhoek and became Dean of the Faculty of Economics and Management Science at the University of Namibia.

After independence in 1990, Tötemeyer was a member of the first Delimitation Commission of Namibia, a body that infrequently decides on the administrative division of the country. He was Director of Elections between 1992 and 1998, became a Member of Parliament in 2000 and was appointed Deputy Minister of Local and Regional Government and Housing. He retired in 2004 due to health concerns. Tötemeyer frequently publishes on politics and education in South Africa and Namibia. Since 2005 Tötemeyer has been Chairman of National Housing Enterprise, a state-owned company providing housing for the poor.

References

External links
 The African Activist Archive Project website includes the conference paper by Gerhard Tötemeyer for the conference NAMIBIA, AFRICA'S LAST COLONY: PROSPECTS FOR FREEDOM AND DEVELOPMENT at the University of Vermont, April 5–6, 1982. THE NAMIBIAN LIBERATION STRUGGLE - the black cause and white obligation

1935 births
Living people
People from Hardap Region
Namibian people of German descent
Members of SWAPO
Stellenbosch University alumni
University of Freiburg alumni
Academic staff of the University of Namibia
White Namibian people